Dumitrescu is a Romanian surname. Notable people with the surname include:

Alexandru Dumitrescu (born 1988), sprint canoer 
Catrinel Dumitrescu (born 1956), actress
Constantin Dumitrescu (boxer) (born 1931)
Constantin Dumitrescu (general) (1868–1935)
Constantin Ticu Dumitrescu (1928–2008), politician
Cristian Dumitrescu (born 1955), politician
Daniel Dumitrescu (born 1968), boxer
Geo Dumitrescu (1920–2004), poet and journalist
George Dumitrescu (1901–1972), poet
George Dorul Dumitrescu (1901 or 1904–1985), prose writer
Iancu Dumitrescu (born 1944), avant-garde composer
Ilie Dumitrescu (born 1969), association football player
Ion Dumitrescu (1925–1999), sports shooter and Olympic champion
Liana Dumitrescu (1973–2011), politician
Nelu Dumitrescu, drummer
Natalia Dumitrescu, abstract painter 
Petre Dumitrescu (1882–1950), general
Puiu Dumitrescu, royal secretary 
Răzvan Dumitrescu, journalist
Ruxandra Dumitrescu, volleyball player
Sava Dumitrescu, pharmacologist and professor
Vasile Dumitrescu, bobsledder
Victor Dumitrescu (1924–1997), soccer player
Zamfir Dumitrescu (1946-2021), painter
Zoe Dumitrescu-Bușulenga, literary critic and philosopher

See also 
 Demetrescu
 Dimitrescu
 Dumitru
 Dumitreni (disambiguation)

Romanian-language surnames
Patronymic surnames